The 1996 NBA Finals was the championship series of the National Basketball Association (NBA)'s 1995–96 season, and the culmination of the season's playoffs. The Western Conference champion Seattle SuperSonics (64–18) played the Eastern Conference champion Chicago Bulls (72–10), with the Bulls holding home court advantage. The teams' 136 combined regular season wins shattered the previous record of 125, set in 1985 between the Los Angeles Lakers who won 62 games and the Boston Celtics who won 63 games in the past regular season. The series, the 50th NBA finals in league history, was played under a best-of-seven format. This was the first championship in the Chicago Bulls' second three-peat.

Chicago won the series 4 games to 2. Michael Jordan was named NBA Finals MVP, his fourth time winning the award.

Background

Chicago Bulls

The Bulls were coming off a season where they lost in the second round of the playoffs to the Orlando Magic.

In their place was a new core of players such as Luc Longley, Toni Kukoč, Steve Kerr, Ron Harper, Jud Buechler, Bill Wennington and Randy Brown. But perhaps their biggest addition to the team was Dennis Rodman, a nine-year veteran who had been a rebounding champion for four straight years, and whose controversial lifestyle has been well-documented.

The result of this ensemble was perhaps the greatest regular season of any team in NBA history at the time, as the Bulls won a record-high 72 games, which would be broken by the Golden State Warriors in the 2015–16 season. They continued to gain momentum in the playoffs, beginning with a sweep of the Miami Heat in the first round, followed by a five-game defeat of the New York Knicks in the second round. The conference finals was a rematch of the previous season's series with the Orlando Magic, but it was a no-contest, as the Bulls swept the Magic to gain entry into the Finals.

Seattle SuperSonics

The SuperSonics were led by Gary Payton and Shawn Kemp, with George Karl as head coach. The team was considered a perennial title contender throughout the mid-1990s, but the closest they came to reaching the finals was in 1993, when they lost to the Phoenix Suns in seven games in the Western Conference Finals.

Two straight first-round exits followed, including the stunning 1994 loss to the eighth-seeded Denver Nuggets (the Sonics were the first seed in that playoffs). Motivated by a successive string of early playoff losses, Seattle finished the 1996 regular season with a franchise-record 64 wins.

Seattle began its playoff run with a four-game win over the Sacramento Kings, followed by a dominant sweep of the defending champion Houston Rockets, headed by a 33 point win in Game 1 where they held Hakeem Olajuwon to 5 points. They then beat the Utah Jazz in seven games in the western finals to advance to its first NBA championship round since .

Road to the Finals

Regular season series
Both teams split the two meetings, each won by the home team:

1996 NBA Finals rosters

Chicago Bulls

Seattle SuperSonics

Series summary

All times are in Eastern Daylight Time (UTC−4).

Game 1

Although Chicago was not playing well offensively, they were able to compensate with superb defense. Frustration set in for Seattle when Frank Brickowski was ejected after committing a flagrant foul against Dennis Rodman, then promptly getting charged with two consecutive technical fouls. Chicago was leading by only 2 at the end of the third quarter, but in the final quarter, shots by Toni Kukoč and 2 key steals by Ron Harper clinched the Bulls' Game 1 win. Shawn Kemp was a bright spot for Seattle, scoring 32 points, but ended up fouling out midway through the fourth quarter. Michael Jordan led the way for the Bulls with 28 points, while Scottie Pippen chipped in with 21 points. Seattle captain Nate McMillan ended up leaving the game due to a debilitating back injury in the 2nd quarter. Dennis Rodman pulled down 13 rebounds for the Bulls, while Toni Kukoč chipped in off the bench with 18 points.

Game 2

Game 2 started well for Seattle with a 27–23 first quarter lead. However, Seattle would once again lose the lead before halftime. Despite Shawn Kemp's 29 points and 13 rebounds, Chicago triumphed with a final score of 92 to 88. In the victory, Dennis Rodman tied an NBA Finals record with 11 offensive rebounds and made a clutch free throw near the end of the game to seal the Bulls victory. Michael Jordan once again led the Bulls with 29 points, while Shawn Kemp continued his strong play by scoring 29 points for Seattle.

Game 3

The Sonics, owners of a 44–5 home record (including playoffs), suffered a 22-point blow-out in their return to Seattle, giving the Bulls a seemingly insurmountable 3–0 series lead. Frustration would once again set in for the Sonics, as Frank Brickowski was ejected for committing a flagrant foul on Dennis Rodman. Michael Jordan led the way for the Bulls with 36 points.

Game 4

Seattle did not want to suffer the ignominy of a sweep. In an attempt to spark his team, Coach George Karl gave Jordan's defensive assignment to Gary Payton, a move which showed immediate results. Seattle succeeded with a 107–86 win over the Bulls, and Sonics fans taunted the Bulls players with homemade signs reading "Sweepless in Seattle". The Sonics were helped by the return of team captain Nate McMillan whose presence entering the game brought the KeyArena crowd to its feet.

Seattle's victory prevented the NBA Finals from being swept in two consecutive years (something which, as of 2022, has never occurred).

Game 5

Seattle would once again deny the Bulls the championship, stretching the series to six games. Payton had this to say: "We feel great. We knew we could play with this team. It just took too long. We should have come with this a little earlier." Shawn Kemp's performance in this game was considered by many to be his best in a Seattle uniform.

Game 6

Chicago won the series 4 games to 2 on Father's Day, in what would be the last time the Sonics played a Finals game before relocating to Oklahoma City and becoming known as the Thunder. The Bulls' victory was partly due to the stellar performance of power forward Dennis Rodman, who delivered a repeat of his Game 2 performance with 19 rebounds, tying his own NBA Finals record. Bulls star Michael Jordan finished the game with 22 points and collected his fourth Finals MVP.

As of 2022, no NBA team has ever overcome a 3-0 playoff series deficit, and only three teams have forced a Game 7 after dropping the first three contests: the New York Knicks (1951), the Denver Nuggets (1994), and the Portland Trail Blazers (2003).

Player statistics

Chicago Bulls

|-
| align="left" |  || 6 || 0 || 8.2 || .500 || .500 || .500 || 0.3 || 0.9 || 0.7 || 0.0 || 2.8
|-
| align="left" |  || 6 || 0 || 5.6 || .222 || .000 || .000 || 0.0 || 0.2 || 0.7 || 0.0 || 0.7
|-
| align="left" |  || 6 || 4 || 19.3 || .375 || .308 || .917 || 2.3 || 1.7 || 0.7 || 0.3 || 6.5
|-! style="background:#FDE910;"
| align="left" |  || 6 || 6 || 42.0 || .415 || .316 || .836 || 5.3 || 4.2 || 1.7 || 0.2 || 27.3
|-
| align="left" |  || 6 || 0 || 18.8 || .303 || .182 || .857 || 0.9 || 0.8 || 0.2 || 0.0 || 5.0
|-
| align="left" |  || 6 || 2 || 29.5 || .423 || .313 || .800 || 4.8 || 3.5 || 0.8 || 0.3 || 13.0
|-
| align="left" |  || 6 || 6 || 28.3 || .574 || .000 || .727 || 3.8|| 2.2 || 0.6 || 1.8 || 11.7
|-
| align="left" |  || 6 || 6 || 41.3 || .343 || .231 || .708 || 8.2 || 5.3 || 2.3 || 1.3 || 15.7
|-
| align="left" |  || 6 || 6 || 37.5 || .486 || .000 || .579 || 14.7 || 2.5 || 0.8 || 0.2 || 7.5
|-
| align="left" |  || 5 || 0 || 3.0 || .000 || .000 || .000 || 0.2 || 0.4 || 0.0 || 0.0 || 0.0
|-
| align="left" |  || 6 || 0 || 7.0 || .667 || .000 || .500 || 0.5 || 0.2 || 0.0 || 0.0 || 2.9

Seattle SuperSonics

|-
| align="left" |  || 4 || 0 || 15.5 || .222 || .200 || 1.000 || 2.5 || 0.5 || 0.5 || 0.0 || 1.8
|-
| align="left" |  || 6 || 3 || 11.3 || .222 || .200 || .000 || 2.0 || 0.5 || 0.2 || 0.2 || 0.8
|-
| align="left" |  || 6 || 6 || 38.3 || .455 || .273 || .923 || 3.5 || 1.0 || 1.2 || 0.2 || 13.3
|-
| align="left" |  || 3 || 3 || 6.7 || .333 || .000 || .000 || 2.3 || 0.3 || 0.3 || 0.3 || 1.3
|-
| align="left" |  || 6 || 6 || 40.3 || .551 || .000 || .857 || 10.0 || 2.2 || 1.3 || 2.0 || 23.3
|-
| align="left" |  || 4 || 0 || 12.8 || .429 || .600 || 1.000 || 2.8 || 1.5 || 0.5 || 0.0 || 2.8
|-
| align="left" |  || 6 || 6 || 45.7 || .444 || .333 || .731 || 6.3 || 7.0 || 1.5 || 0.0 || 18.0
|-
| align="left" |  || 6 || 0 || 31.7 || .377 || .235 || .810 || 4.7 || 2.0 || 0.5 || 0.0 || 11.2
|-
| align="left" |  || 4 || 0 || 2.0 || .000 || .000 || .000 || 0.5 || 0.0 || 0.0 || 0.0 || 0.0
|-
| align="left" |  || 6 || 6 || 39.7 || .443 || .389 || .875 || 5.0 || 2.5 || 0.5 || 0.2 || 16.3
|-
| align="left" |  || 6 || 0 || 1.5 || .000 || .000 || .000 || 0.3 || 0.2 || 0.0 || 0.0 || 0.0
|-
| align="left" |  || 6 || 0 || 8.0 || .500 || .500 || 1.000 || 0.3 || 0.0 || 0.0 || 0.0 || 2.5

Broadcasting
The Finals was aired in the United States on NBC. Bob Costas hosted the pre-game, halftime and post-game show with analysts Julius Erving and Peter Vecsey. Games were called by Marv Albert, Matt Guokas and Bill Walton, while Ahmad Rashad and Hannah Storm served as sideline reporters.

Aftermath
The 1996 NBA Finals would be the last Finals appearance of the Seattle SuperSonics. The Sonics would win the Pacific Division again in 1997 and 1998, but fell to the second round of the playoffs each time. The series was George Karl's only Finals appearance in his coaching career to date. In 2008, the Sonics franchise moved to Oklahoma City and became the Thunder. They would make the finals four years later after the move, losing to the Miami Heat.

This was also the last time a Seattle-based team played for a major professional sports championship until Super Bowl XL in 2006, when the Seattle Seahawks lost to the Pittsburgh Steelers. The Seahawks would go on to handily defeat the Denver Broncos in Super Bowl XLVIII in 2014 and lose to the New England Patriots the following year in Super Bowl XLIX. In terms of overall sports leagues, the city would later enjoy six additional championships: the WNBA's Seattle Storm, a one-time SuperSonics sister team, won the 2004, the 2010, the 2018, and the 2020 WNBA Finals, and the MLS's Seattle Sounders FC won 2016 MLS Cup and 2019 MLS Cup.

Teams from Chicago and Seattle would meet three more times in postseason competition among the "Big Four" leagues. The only time Seattle won over Chicago was in the 2000 American League Division Series, when the Seattle Mariners swept the Chicago White Sox 3–0.

The Bulls came close to winning 70 games for the second straight year, instead settling for a 69-win campaign in 1997. They won their second straight title over the Utah Jazz in six games of the 1997 NBA Finals. In the off-season that preceded Scottie Pippen became the first person to win NBA championship and Olympic gold medal in the same year twice, playing for Team USA at the Atlanta Olympics. The Bulls would also defeat the Utah Jazz in six games in the 1998 NBA Finals.

The Bulls' combined 87 wins in the regular season and postseason would stand as an NBA record until the 2015-16 Golden State Warriors, coached by former Bull Steve Kerr, broke it with 88 total wins (thanks to the first round using a best-of-7 format instead of the best-of-5 in 1996), including a 73-9 regular season mark. However, the Warriors lost to the Cleveland Cavaliers in the 2016 NBA Finals, failing to repeat as champions after beating the same Cavaliers in the previous Finals.

See also
1996 NBA Playoffs

Notes and references

External links

NBA.com's History of 1996 NBA Finals

National Basketball Association Finals
Finals
NBA
NBA
1996 in sports in Illinois
1990s in Chicago
1996 in Illinois
1996 in sports in Washington (state)
1996 in Seattle
Basketball competitions in Seattle
Basketball competitions in Chicago
June 1996 sports events in the United States